Ultimate Holding Company is a British arts collective situated in Manchester. It is known for This is Camp X-Ray and Ext-inked and was founded by Jai Redman and Joseph Richardson in 2002.

References

Culture in Manchester
British artist groups and collectives
2002 establishments in England